Jozvenaq (also Romanized as Jazvanaq, Jazoonaq, Jazvanq; also known as Chaftan, Jaftān, and Jozvenū) is a village in Dast Jerdeh Rural District, Chavarzaq District, Tarom County, Zanjan Province, Iran. At the 2006 census, its population was 52, in 15 families.

References 

Populated places in Tarom County